Weilheim is a municipality in the district of Waldshut in Baden-Württemberg in Germany.

See also

 List of cities and towns in Germany

References

Waldshut (district)
Baden